Wari (hispanicized spelling Huari) is a traditional dance of the Ancash Region in Peru. The dancers are accompanied by musicians who play the tinya and the small pinkuyllu.

See also 
 Tinya palla

References 

Peruvian dances
Native American dances
Ancash Region